Sheldon H. Katz (19 December 1956, Brooklyn) is an American mathematician, specializing in algebraic geometry and its applications to string theory.

Background and Career
In 1973 Katz won first prize in the U.S.A. Mathematical Olympiad. He received in 1976 his bachelor's degree from MIT and in 1980 his Ph.D. from Princeton University under Robert C. Gunning with thesis Deformations of Linear Systems, Divisors and Weierstrass Points on Curves. At the University of Utah, he was an instructor from 1980 to 1984. At the University of Oklahoma he was an assistant professor from 1984 to 1987. At Oklahoma State University, he became in 1987 an assistant professor, in 1989 an associate professor, in 1994 a full professor, in 1997 Southwestern Bell Professor, and in 1999 Regents Professor. Since 2001 he has been a professor at the University of Illinois, Urbana-Champaign, where he was chair of the department in 2006–2011.

For the academic year 1982/83 he was a visiting scholar at the Institute for Advanced Study. He was a visiting professor at the Mittag-Leffler Institute (1997), at Duke University (1991/92) and at the University of Bayreuth (1989).

His research on algebraic geometry and its applications to string theory (including mirror symmetry) and supersymmetry has been published in prestigious journals in mathematics and physics.

In 2013 he was elected a Fellow of the American Mathematical Society.

Selected publications

Articles
with Bruce Crauder: 
with Alberto Albano: 
with David R. Morrison and M. Ronen Plesser: 
with Eric Sharpe: 
with Tony Pantev and E. Sharpe: 
with Andrei Caldararu and E. Sharpe: 
with Ron Donagi and E. Sharpe: 
with D. Morrison, Sakura Schäfer-Nameki, and James Sully: 
with Jinwon Choi and Albrecht Klemm:

Books
 with Rahul Pandharipande, Cumrun Vafa, Ravi Vakil, Eric Zaslow, Kentaro Hori, Albrecht Klemm, Richard Thomas: Mirror Symmetry, Clay Mathematics Monographs, vol. 1, 2003
 with David A. Cox:

References

1956 births
Living people
20th-century American mathematicians
21st-century American mathematicians
Fellows of the American Mathematical Society
Massachusetts Institute of Technology alumni
Princeton University alumni
University of Utah faculty
Oklahoma State University faculty
University of Oklahoma faculty
University of Illinois Urbana-Champaign faculty
Algebraic geometers
American string theorists
Mathematicians from New York (state)